The men's points race at the 2018 Commonwealth Games, as part of the cycling programme, took place on 8 April 2018.

Schedule
The schedule was as follows:

All times are Australian Eastern Standard Time (UTC+10)

Results

Qualifying
60 laps (15 km) were raced with 6 sprints. The top 12 per heat advanced to the finals.

Heat 1

Heat 2

Final
160 laps (40 km) were raced with 16 sprints.

References

Men's points race
Cycling at the Commonwealth Games – Men's points race